Nathaniel Stephens (1589 – 30 May 1660) was an English politician who sat in the House of Commons at various times between 1628 and 1653. He supported the Parliamentarian cause in the English Civil War.

Biography
Stephens was the son of Richard Stephens of Eastington. He inherited Chavenage House and enhanced the house which had been reconstructed by his father. He was elected Member of Parliament for Gloucestershire in 1628 and sat until 1629 when King Charles I  decided to rule without parliament for eleven years.

In November 1640, Stephens was re-elected MP for Gloucestershire in the Long Parliament. He was Colonel of a regiment of horse which he raised in support of Parliament in the Civil War. In 1644 he was sent to Gloucester to secure the town and relieve Colonel Edward Massey for other duties. In 1645 he was granted a commission to investigate the spoils of Forest of Dean.

Stephens acquiesced in the trial and execution of Charles I in 1649, and a few months later he was struck down with a fatal sickness, which gave rise to the legend of Chavenage. Henry Ireton had been sent to visit Stephens at Christmas time in 1648 to persuade him to acquiesce in the execution of the King. Stephens, known as a mild man, was wavering but it is said the Ireton sat up all night and persuaded him. In the New Year, Stephens' daughter Abigail returned home and angrily laid a curse on her father for bringing the family name into disrepute. The story goes that after being taken terminally ill, he never rose from his bed again.

Stephens died at the age of 71 and was buried at Eastington on 30 May 1660. It was said that at his funeral, a hearse drew up at the door of the manor house driven by the figure of a headless man, and thereupon the ghost of Stephens rose from the coffin and paid deep reverence.

Family
By 1617 Stephens had married Catherine, daughter of Robert Beale of Barnes, Surrey. They had three sons and six daughters (a son and a daughter predeceased him).

On 25 February 1661 Stephens's daughter Abigail married Edward Harley. They had four sons (one of whom predeceased his father) and one daughter, Their son Robert became 1st Earl of Oxford, and another son Edward (1664–1735) became a Member of Parliament for the constituencies of Droitwich and Leominster.

Notes

References

 

1589 births
1660 deaths
English ghosts
Roundheads
People from Gloucestershire
English MPs 1628–1629
English MPs 1640–1648
Politicians from Gloucestershire